Suchow, Soochow, Su-chow, and Soo-chow are irregular romanizations of various Chinese placenames.

They generally refer to:

 Xuzhou in Jiangsu
 Suzhou in Jiangsu
 Suzhou, Gansu, a former name of Jiuquan in Gansu
 Xuzhou, Sichuan, a former name of Yibin in Sichuan
 Soochow University (Suzhou), Suzhou, China
 Soochow University (Taiwan), in Taipei
 Soochow (crater) on Mars

Other uses
 Suchów in Poland

See also 
 Suzhou (disambiguation)
 Xuzhou (disambiguation)